Lower Town is an unincorporated community in Mono County, California.

Lower Town was part of a string of towns established by Freemasons, others being Middle Town and Upper Town.

References

Unincorporated communities in California
Unincorporated communities in Mono County, California